Massachusetts House of Representatives' 12th Middlesex district in the United States is one of 160 legislative districts included in the lower house of the Massachusetts General Court. It covers part of the city of Newton in Middlesex County. Democrat Ruth Balser of Newton has represented the district since 2003.

The current district geographic boundary overlaps with that of the Massachusetts Senate's 1st Middlesex and Norfolk district.

Representatives
 Laurin Leland, circa 1858 
 Nathaniel Dowse, circa 1859 
 James E. Whitcher, circa 1888 
 Howard B. White, circa 1920 
 Earle S. Bagley, circa 1951 
 Robert A. Manzelli, circa 1975 
 Ruth B. Balser, 2003-current

Former locale
The district previously covered Waltham, circa 1872.

See also
 List of Massachusetts House of Representatives elections
 List of Massachusetts General Courts
 List of former districts of the Massachusetts House of Representatives
 Other Middlesex County districts of the Massachusetts House of Representatives: 1st, 2nd, 3rd, 4th, 5th, 6th, 7th, 8th, 9th, 10th, 11th, 13th, 14th, 15th, 16th, 17th, 18th, 19th, 20th, 21st, 22nd, 23rd, 24th, 25th, 26th, 27th, 28th, 29th, 30th, 31st, 32nd, 33rd, 34th, 35th, 36th, 37th

Images
Portraits of legislators

References

External links
 Ballotpedia
  (State House district information based on U.S. Census Bureau's American Community Survey).
 League of Women Voters of Newton

House
Government of Middlesex County, Massachusetts